Komsomolsky District is an administrative and municipal district (raion), one of the seventeen in Khabarovsk Krai, Russia. It is located in the southern central part of the krai. Its administrative center is the city of Komsomolsk-on-Amur (which is not administratively a part of the district). Population:

Geography
The Amur river flows by the city.

Administrative and municipal status
Within the framework of administrative divisions, Komsomolsky District is one of the seventeen in the krai. The city of Komsomolsk-on-Amur serves as its administrative center, despite being incorporated separately as a city of krai significance—an administrative unit with the status equal to that of the districts.

As a municipal division, the district is incorporated as Komsomolsky Municipal District. The city of krai significance of Komsomolsk-on-Amur is incorporated separately from the district as Komsomolsk-na-Amure Urban Okrug.

References

Notes

Sources

Districts of Khabarovsk Krai
